Heber Springs Municipal Airport  is a public-use airport located  northeast of the central business district of Heber Springs, in Cleburne County, Arkansas, United States. It is owned by the City of Heber Springs.

This airport is included in the FAA's National Plan of Integrated Airport Systems for 2011–2015, which categorized it as a general aviation airport.

Although most U.S. airports use the same three-letter location identifier for the FAA and IATA, this airport is assigned HBZ by the FAA but has no designation from the IATA.

Facilities and aircraft 

For the 12-month period ending November 30, 2010, the airport had 19,500 aircraft operations, an average of 53 per day: 97% general aviation and 3% military. At that time there were 29 aircraft based at this airport: 83% single-engine and 17% multi-engine.

References

External links 
 Heber Springs Municipal Airport (HBZ) at Arkansas Department of Aeronautics
 Aerial image as of 28 February 2001 from USGS The National Map
 

Airports in Arkansas
Transportation in Cleburne County, Arkansas